Mary Borgstrom (May 18, 1916 – April 3, 2019) was a Canadian potter, ceramist, and artist who specialized in primitive techniques. She was presented with the "Award of Excellence" by the Canadian Guild of Crafts in Quebec.

Life 
Borgstrom was born in Saskatchewan in 1916, and later moved to Provost, Alberta.

 
In Edmonton, Alberta in the mid 1960s, she attended a workshop on primitive pottery offered by the ceramist Hal Riegger, getting exposed to techniques of the craft. Shortly thereafter in the late 1960s and early 1970s, she "emerged as one of the most unique ceramic talents in Alberta". Her artwork was shown world-wide, and appeared in numerous collections and exhibitions.

In 1976 Borgstrom was invited to participate in the Arts and Culture program in the 1976 Summer Olympics in Montreal.

Borgstrom died on April 3, 2019 at the age of 102 at the Provost Health Centre in Provost, Alberta.

Reviews and awards 
 Virginia J Watt, a director at the Canadian Guild of Crafts stated: "In all of her work, she maintains a sober austerity that gives  her primitive style its purity and sophistication."
 Alberta Art Foundation, on her work "Her piece ... represents the unique development of civilization on the Canadian prairies."
 The Canadian Guild of Crafts Quebec presented Mary with the "Award of Excellence".
 Eileen Lewenstein and Emmanuel Cooper in "New Ceramics" stated: "Mary Borgstrom, who lives in a rural area of Alberta, has led many people to an interest in primitive pottery."

Creative Process 
Often claiming to be inspired by the natural landscape, Borgstrom scavenged for her own artistic materials in the nature surrounding her childhood home. This included the cultivation of clay. Here, Borgstrom created her pottery workshop later in her life. Borgstrom attests to working within a "primitive technique" of pottery and clay making. This technique, often called "primitive firing" is a process in which a potter employs the use of a handmade raku kiln. This practice includes the firing of clay works, called raku ware, at extremely hot temperatures for prolonged periods of time. This process allows for a sense of "artistic closeness" between the artist and the works.

Art Market 
In January 2022, Mary Borgstrom's home and personal workshop were bought and restored by Alex Archbold of Curiosity Incorporated. Archbold insured surviving works, preparing them for the private art market, where they were insured for up to $10,000 USD.

Exhibitions 
In 1971, twenty-five of Borgstrom's clay works were exhibited at the Canadian Guid of Handicrafts acquired by the Montreal Museum of Fine Art, resulting in an innovation to attend the Arts and Culture Program at the 1976 Summer Olympics held in Montreal, Canada. Borgstrom's works are held internationally in Japanese and English collections. Several of Borgstrom's pieces are currently on display across Canadian galleries including the Art Gallery of Alberta and the National Gallery of Canada.

References

External links
 

1916 births
2019 deaths
Artists from Saskatchewan
Canadian ceramists
Canadian women ceramists
Canadian centenarians
20th-century Canadian women artists
20th-century Canadian artists
20th-century ceramists
21st-century Canadian women artists
21st-century Canadian artists
21st-century ceramists
Women centenarians
Artists from Alberta